Manipal University Jaipur (MUJ) is a co-educational, residential, private research university located in the city of Jaipur in Rajasthan, India. It is the fifth university established by Manipal Global Education Services. Courses and programs offered by the university are in the fields of Engineering, Architecture, Interior Design, Fashion Design, Fine Arts, Hospitality, Humanities, Journalism and Mass Communication, Basic Sciences, Law, Commerce, Computer Applications, and Management

The campus of the institute has a total land area of 122 acres, with the constructed area of 2.47 million sq ft.; it was the first university in Rajasthan to be accredited as A+ (3.28) grade by NAAC.

The University has set up an Entrepreneurship Cell and provides generous support for startups, Incubation Centre-Manipal University Jaipur (AIC-MUJ) is an initiative of MUJ & Atal Innovation Mission, NITI Aayog, AIC- MUJ is established to cater & nurture innovation and thrives to provide support an ecosystem for better growth of the start-ups. In addition, MUJ has also signed MOU with National Skill Development Corporation (NSDC) for imparting skill based training to the students and to improve their employability.

To support state and local region students from nearby villages, Rajasthan Merit Scholarship and Local Region Scholarship are also offered by the University every year.

The current president and chancellor of the university is Ramdas Pai.

History

The Manipal Education Group includes five Universities: Manipal Academy of Higher Education (MAHE, Karnataka), Sikkim Manipal University (Sikkim), American University of Antigua (Caribbean Islands), Manipal International University (Malaysia) and Manipal University Jaipur (Jaipur).

Manipal University Jaipur (MUJ) was launched in 2011 on an invitation from the Government of Rajasthan, as a self-financed State University.

Recognition and Accreditations 
Manipal University Jaipur (Rajasthan) has been established by an Act  (No. 21 of  2011) of  State Legislature of Rajasthan as a State Private University as specified by the UGC under section 22 of the UGC Act 1956.

 University is UGC Approved
 B.Tech Programs are AICTE Approved.
 BA LLB and LLB Programs are Bar Council of India (BCI) Approved.
 B.Arch Program are Council of Architecture (COA) Approved.

Rankings

International collaborations

n + i
Manipal University Jaipur has signed an MOU with n + i, a network of 70 French Institutions. It enables students to gain experience at any of these institutions in France. Interested students may learn about institutions, programmes offered by them, scholarships available and the application procedure. Students may also focus on funding opportunities by Indian institutions to support the project work.

ACCA 
The university has academic collaboration with Association of Chartered Certified Accountants (ACCA), UK. In this program, the student will have the option of obtaining an ACCA qualification along with graduate degree of B.Com (Hons.) Accounting.

CIMA
Collaboration with the Chartered Institute of Management Accountants (CIMA) in the United Kingdom is intended to connect the B.Com and BBA students with the world's largest professional body of management accountants. It enables students to use the Chartered Global Management Accountant (CGMA) designation and be part of a global network.

CIMA offers five levels of courses. Students must complete all levels to become a member of the international professional body; students have the option to exit the course on completion of each level. CIMA awards certificates according to the students' successful completion of the prescribed papers at each level.

IAESTE
The International Association for the Exchange of Students for Technical Experience (IAESTE), founded in 1948 at Imperial College London is an independent, non-profit and non-political organization for operational and consultative relationship with agencies of the United Nations. With headquarters in Austria, it has a presence in over 85 countries. Annually, IASETE exchanges more than 6,000 students, playing a role in the development of students. The international organization focuses on exchanging students for technical work experience abroad. Students gain relevant technical training lasting from 4 weeks to 18 months.

IAESTE LC MUJ is the local association body of IAESTE India run by a student governing body.

Student life

TEDx Manipal University Jaipur
TEDx is a program of local, self-organized events that bring people together to share a TED-like experience. At a TEDx event, TED Talks video and live speakers combine to spark deep discussion and connection.

TEDx Manipal University Jaipur is one of the biggest TEDx conferences in Rajasthan. Organised by the students, the event takes place on a licence granted by TED, a non-profit organisation. Speakers at the university include Shekhar Ravjiani, Saroj Khan, Athar Aamir Khan, Dolly Singh, Manvendra Singh Gohil, Ravi Jhankal, Asif Basra, Gaurav Taneja and Abhinav Mahajan.

Startups 
In MUJ the Startup Culture by ECell MUJ has been most profound and have made the grounds for most promising startups in Manipal University Jaipur like Piltover Technologies, Mext and Actello. These are the startups which have been mostly on the face of Rajasthan and India have won many competitions.

References

External links 
 Official website

Universities in Rajasthan
Private universities in India
Universities and colleges in Jaipur
Manipal Education and Medical Group
Educational institutions established in 2011
2011 establishments in Rajasthan